The total return on a portfolio of investments takes into account not only the capital appreciation on the portfolio, but also the income received on the portfolio. The income typically consists of interest, dividends, and securities lending fees.  This contrasts with the price return, which takes into account only the capital gain on an investment. In 2010 an academic paper highlighted this issue found with most web charts in the 'compare' mode, and was published in the Journal of Behavioral Finance. The discrepancy between total return charts and "price only" charts was later brought out in the Wall Street Journal.

Stock and bond funds provide annual Total Return values summarizing the last ten years of operation. Total Return assumes that dividends and interest are reinvested in the funds. 
A reasonably accurate equation for the percent Total Return in a year of any security is the sum of the percent gain (or loss, a negative percent) over the year in the security value, plus the annual dividend yield expressed as a percent (100 × annual dividends divided by the security price at the beginning of the year). This slightly understates the Total Return because it ignores the reinvestment of dividends, as soon as they are paid, for purchasing more of the security. Professor Pankaj Agrrawal produced the ReturnFinder App to rectify the issue created by these web-charts, the App's algorithm includes dividends and bond income in the total return calculations. The problem can lead to the pernicious inversion of performance ordering with bond ETF's or stocks paying high dividends.

A variant measure of total return is tax-adjusted or after-tax return, which approximates the effective return that a tax-paying investor actually sees considering taxes paid on distributions.

References

See also 

 Investment performance
 Rate of return
 Returns (economics) 
 Interest
 Dividend
 Price return

Factor income distribution